Agnes Huntington (later, Agnes Huntington Cravath; ca. 1864 – March 10, 1953) was an American operatic singer. For several years, she received private tutoring in Europe for music, languages, and drawing. She had a notable career in concert and opera as a prima donna contralto.

Early years and education
Agnes Huntington was born in Kalamazoo, Michigan, in ca. 1864. She was the daughter of Charles E. and Fannie E. (Munsell) Huntington and was raised by them in New York City.

She was educated at Mrs. Sylvanus Reed's School for Girls in New York City. In 1880, her family decided that she should follow a career of her own choosing. She hesitated to choose between music and art, for both were attractive to her, and she finally decided to become an operatic singer. Her rich contralto voice was inherited from her mother.

Huntington went to Dresden in 1880, where she studied for four years with Giovanni Battista Lamperti. Said Huntington:—

Career
Huntington made her first public appearance in concert in Dresden, in January, 1884, and a few weeks later, sang at the Gewandhaus in Leipzig with the regular orchestra under direction of Carl Reinecke. Later appearances were in Stuttgart with Joseph Joachim (Hungarian violinist), then with Pablo de Sarasate (Spanish violinist), and Klintworth and his orchestra at the Sing-Akademie zu Berlin. She next appeared in a concert given by Alexandre Guilmant and Édouard Colonne and his Concerts Colonne orchestra at the Trocadéro in Paris. Later, she appeared in concerts in London in association with great musicians and conductors, including Sir Julius Benedict, Wilhelm Ganz, Alberto Randegger, Sir George Grove and others, which brought her much social attention. At this time, she received from the then Princess of Wales (later, the Dowager Queen Alexandra) a beautiful brooch of precious stones. She also sang in Paris. 

In 1885, she made her American debut with the New York Philharmonic Orchestra, under the direction of Theodore Thomas, who engaged her for the Philadelphia Symphony Orchestra and other concerts, of which he was the conductor. She also sang with the Boston Symphony Orchestra with William Goricke, the Oratorio Society of New York with Walter Damrosch, and in many of the most important festivals under the greatest conductors in the U.S. and Canada. After making a tour of the principal cities, she joined the Boston Ideal Opera Company, and with that company, she sang successfully for several seasons. Next, she sang with the Bostonians, in which she visited the principal cities of the United States and Canada, appearing in the leading roles of the standard operas, for which her commanding presence and contralto voice eminently fitted her. With the Bostonians, she gained experience in acting, singing in Martha, Giralda, Fra Diavolo, Les Mousquetaires de la reine, The Bohemian Girl, Mignon, and others. 

In 1889 she went to London, under the management of the Carl Rosa Opera Company, having signed for a season of concert, oratorio, and light opera. There, she created the title role in Paul Jones by Robert Planquette, in which she made a great hit. Originally put on for a short run, Paul Jones remained on the boards during 346 nights in the Prince of Wales Theatre, and at every performance the house was crowded. A dispute with her managers led her to leave the company, and she returned to the U.S.

When Huntington's year in London was finished, she determined to become a star and produce her own operas. Under the management of Marcus Mayer she began her career as a star in Paul Jones in New York, and she could have selected no better production. She asserted that her short experience convinced her that the public had grown tired of coarse fun and vulgarity and would patronize opéra comique that was clean and pure, with a story to tell, a consistent plot to unfold, and ennobled with good music and well-concerted orchestration, and that her ventures were made upon this assumption.

The ambition of Huntington as a caterer of operatic productions for the entertainment of the public led her to constant novelty and progressiveness, and as a result, she presented Planquette's work, Captain Therese. As Huntington personally superintended all of her own productions in every detail, the amount of labor which devolves upon her may be imagined, and her own description of her work in this respect was thus:—

In all her travels, Huntington was accompanied by her mother, who proved to be her best friend and adviser, and between the two there existed the utmost devotion. With her company, Huntington is deservedly popular. If she is a strict disciplinarian, she is also generous, and the slightest complaint of any wrong or oversight finds her always a willing listener and quick to rectify any error. On the occasion of the disbandment of her company in 1891, a list was presented to her of the fines inflicted upon several of the members during its continuance for tardiness and oversights. In some cases, these amounted to considerable sums. She generously remitted every fine, paid her company in full, and re-engaged its best members on the spot.

Not the least drag upon her time was correspondence involved in answers to the many letters she received from girls about how to adopt the stage, asking her advice regarding the qualifications necessary and the best means of procuring engagements. These letters she felt it a duty to answer. She encouraged none with false hopes, but represented the trials and labors of stage life fully and clearly, so that the frivolous were deterred, while the truly ambitious were encouraged. Most careful and painstaking in every effort, she abhorred nothing so much as a sham, and would not tolerate meretricious advertising or any tricks of the trade, so often resorted to by actors for the sake of notoriety. She trusted entirely to the excellence of her productions, upon which she spared no expense in staging, and in which her entire fortune was invested, and to her own merit, for recognition and patronage. She had in her efforts shown English opéra comique to be a high grade of entertaining amusement.

Huntington was tall, fair and of commanding presence. Her voice was a pure, clear, strong and thoroughly cultivated contralto. In London, her social successes were as great as her professional ones. Among her intimate friends, there were the Baroness Burdett-Coutts, the Duchess of Westminster, and other prominent personages. She served as director of the New York Symphony Society, and the Institute of Musical Arts and others.

Personal life
On November 15, 1892, in Saint Thomas Church, Manhattan, she married attorney Paul Drennan Cravath, with whom she had one daughter, Vera Agnes Huntington Cravath (b. 1895). Following marriage, she became a director of several charities, and contributed to many charitable societies. She was an animal activist, and a member of the Colony Club. Huntington was Episcopalian, and opposed women's suffrage.

As reported on page one of The New York Times'', the couple became legally and permanently separated, in 1926, while remaining married. Their daughter, then separated from her first husband, moved in with her father, until her second marriage the following year.

She resided at 105 E. Thirty-ninth Street, in New York City, with a country estate in Locust Valley, Long Island, New York. Huntington died in Manhattan, on March 10, 1953, and was buried at Woodlawn Cemetery, The Bronx.

Notes

References

Attribution

 
 
 

1864 births
1953 deaths
Singers from Michigan
American operatic contraltos
People from Kalamazoo, Michigan
Classical musicians from Michigan
Wikipedia articles incorporating text from A Woman of the Century